A list of American films released in 1951.

Danny Kaye hosted the 24th Academy Awards ceremony on held at the RKO Pantages Theatre in Hollywood. The winner of the Best Motion Picture category was Metro-Goldwyn-Mayer's An American in Paris.

The other four nominated pictures were Decision Before Dawn, A Place in the Sun, Quo Vadis, and A Streetcar Named Desire.

Vivien Leigh won the Oscar for Best Actress for her role as Blanche DuBois in A Streetcar Named Desire. Leigh had also played Blanche in the London stage production that had been directed by her then-husband Laurence Olivier. Other Best Actress nominees that year were Katharine Hepburn for The African Queen (Hepburn's 5th Best Actress Nomination), Eleanor Parker for Detective Story, Shelley Winters for A Place in the Sun, and Jane Wyman for The Blue Veil.

Humphrey Bogart won his only Oscar for his portrayal of Charlie Allnut in The African Queen. Other Best Actor nominees for that year were Marlon Brando for A Streetcar Named Desire, Montgomery Clift for A Place in the Sun, Arthur Kennedy for Bright Victory, and Fredric March for Death of a Salesman.

The 9th Golden Globe Awards also honored the best films of 1951. That year's Golden Globes also marked the first time that the Best Picture category was split into Musical or Comedy, or Drama. A Place in the Sun won Best Motion Picture - Drama, while An American in Paris won Best Motion Picture - Musical or Comedy. Fredric March won Best Actor, Drama, for Death of a Salesman, while Danny Kaye won Best Actor, Musical or Comedy, for On the Riviera. Jane Wyman won Best Actress, Drama, for her role in The Blue Veil, while June Allyson won Best Actress, Musical or Comedy, for Too Young to Kiss.

1951 also saw the film debut of Grace Kelly and Carroll Baker.

A

B

C-D

E-H

I-M

N-R

S-Z

Documentaries

Serials

Shorts

See also
 1951 in the United States

References

External links

1951 films at the Internet Movie Database

1951
Films
Lists of 1951 films by country or language